The 5th constituency of Paris (French: Cinquième circonscription de Paris) is a French legislative constituency in the department of Paris. Like the other 576 French constituencies, it elects one member of the National Assembly using the two-round system. Its boundaries were heavily redrawn in 1988 and 2012. From 1958 until 1988 it was located on the Rive Gauche; since then it has been located on the Rive Droite. In the 2017 legislative election, Benjamin Griveaux of La République En Marche! (LREM) won a majority of the vote. Upon his appointment to the executive branch in 2017, he left his mandate to his substitute Élise Fajgeles, before regaining it in 2019.

Deputies

Election results

2022

 
 
 
 
 
 
 
 
|-
| colspan="8" bgcolor="#E9E9E9"|
|-

2017

 
 
 
 
 
 
|-
| colspan="8" bgcolor="#E9E9E9"|
|-

2012

2007
Elections between 1988 and 2007 were based on the 1988 boundaries.

 
 
 
 
 
 
 
|-
| colspan="8" bgcolor="#E9E9E9"|
|-

2002

 
 
 
 
 
 
|-
| colspan="8" bgcolor="#E9E9E9"|
|-

1997

 
 
 
 
 
 
 
|-
| colspan="8" bgcolor="#E9E9E9"|
|-

References

5